Helen Elizabeth Roy,  (born 6 November 1969) is a British ecologist, entomologist, and academic, specialising in ladybirds and non-native species. Since 2007, she has been a principal scientist and ecologist at the NERC's Centre for Ecology & Hydrology. From 1997 to 2008, she taught at Anglia Ruskin University, rising to the rank of Reader in Ecology. She is the co-organiser of the UK Ladybird Survey, alongside Dr Peter Brown, is a visiting professor in the School of Biological Sciences, University of Reading and is a past President of the Royal Entomological Society.

Early life and education
Roy was born on 6 November 1969 in Plymouth, England. She was educated at Cowes High School, a state secondary school on the Isle of Wight. From 1989 to 1992, she studied biology at the University of Southampton, graduating with an upper-second class Bachelor of Science (BSc) degree. From 1993 to 1994, she studied environmental science at the University of Nottingham, graduating with a Master of Science (MSc) degree. She remained at Nottingham to undertake a Doctor of Philosophy (PhD) degree, which she completed in 1997 with a doctoral thesis titled "Interactions between aphid predators and the entomopathogenic fungus Erynia neoaphidis".

Honours
Roy was awarded the 2012 Silver Medal by the Zoological Society of London "for contributions to the scientific understanding of ladybird ecology and conservation". In the 2018 New Year Honours, she was appointed a Member of the Order of the British Empire (MBE) "for services to biodiversity research, science communication and citizen science". In 2020 she was awarded the British Ecological Society's Ecological Engagement Award for her work in citizen science and public engagement.

Selected works

References

External links

Professor Roy giving a lecture for the Linnean Society, 2019: Unravelling the Ecology of Invasive Non-native Species.
Professor Roy speaks about citizen science at the 'Rigour and Openness in 21st Century Science conference'. 11th April 2013.

1969 births
Living people
British ecologists
Women ecologists
British entomologists
Women entomologists
Academics of Anglia Ruskin University
Academics of the University of Reading
Members of the Order of the British Empire
People from Cowes
Alumni of the University of Southampton
Science communicators
Fellows of the Royal Entomological Society